Benjamin Harrison Kline (July 11, 1894 – January 7, 1974) was an American cinematographer and film director. He was the father of Richard H. Kline.

Biography

Kline was born in Birmingham, Alabama and started his career as a cinematographer in 1920 with Universal Pictures' Red Lane.  Over his career he shot about 350 films and television shows, a number that includes many serials and a large number of Three Stooges short subjects for Columbia Pictures.  He worked up through about 1972.  His son Richard H. Kline was also a noted cinematographer.  Kline also directed eight films during the period of 1931–1945.

Partial filmography

As director 
Kline directed seven films, one Rin Tin Tin serial and six westerns:  
 The Lightning Warrior (1931)
 Cowboy in the Clouds (1943)
 Sundown Valley (1944)
 Cowboy from Lonesome River (1944)
 Cyclone Prairie Rangers (1944)
 Saddle Leather Law (1944)
 Sagebrush Heroes (1945)

Sources also suggest that Kline replaced B. Reeves Eason as uncredited director of the serial The Galloping Ghost in 1931.

As cinematographer 

 Hitchin' Posts (1920)
 After Your Own Heart (1921)
 The Rough Diamond (1921)
 Trailin' (1921)
 The Lady from Longacre (1921)
 The Night Horsemen (1921)
A Ridin' Romeo (1921)
 Hands Off! (1921)
 Sky High (1922)
 Chasing the Moon (1922)
 Up and Going (1922)
 Wolf Law (1922)
 McGuire of the Mounted (1923)
 The Six-Fifty (1923)
 The Untameable (1923) 
 Pure Grit (1923)
 The Scarlet West (1925)
 Red Clay (1927)
 Sensation Seekers (1927)
 Painted Faces (1929)
 Peacock Alley (1930)
 Call of the West (1930)
 The Fighting Fool (1932)
 The Last Man (1932)
 War Correspondent (1932)
 Texas Cyclone (1932)
 The California Trail (1933)
 Police Car 17 (1933)
 The Wrecker (1933)
 Shadows of Sing Sing (1933)
 When Strangers Marry (1933)
 East of Fifth Avenue (1933)
 Hold the Press (1933)
 The Ninth Guest (1934)
 The Hell Cat (1934)
 The Prescott Kid (1934)
 The Man Trailer (1934)
 The Line-Up (1934)
 Guard That Girl (1935)
 The Revenge Rider (1935)
 Riding Wild (1935)
 End of the Trail (1936)
 West of Cheyenne (1938)
 South of Arizona (1938)
 The Colorado Trail (1938)
 The Great Adventures of Wild Bill Hickok (1938 serial)
 Call of the Rockies (1938)
 Law of the Plains (1938)
 Flying G-Men (1939 serial) 
 Mandrake the Magician (1939 serial)
 Overland with Kit Carson (1939 serial)
 The Man They Could Not Hang (1939)
 Scandal Sheet (1939)
 Cafe Hostess (1940)
 Nobody's Children (1940)
 Before I Hang (1940)
 Roaring Frontiers (1941)
 Hands Across the Rockies (1941)
 The Lone Prairie (1942)
 Ever Since Venus (1944)
 Tahiti Nights (1944)
 Detour (1945)
 Rolling Home (1946)
 Joe Palooka, Champ (1946)
 Strange Journey (1946)
 I Ring Doorbells (1946)
 Shoot to Kill (1947)
 Half Past Midnight (1948)
 Tough Assignment (1949)
 The Judge (1949)
 Omoo-Omoo, the Shark God (1949)
 Miami Exposé (1956)
 Zombies of Mora Tau (1957)

References

External links 
 
 

1894 births
1974 deaths
American cinematographers
Film directors from Alabama
People from Birmingham, Alabama
Burials at Hollywood Forever Cemetery